Aethioprocris congoensis is a moth of the  family Zygaenidae. It is known from the Democratic Republic of the Congo.

References

Procridinae
Moths of Africa
Moths described in 1957
Endemic fauna of the Democratic Republic of the Congo